J. K. Rowling's Harry Potter universe contains numerous settings for the events in her fantasy novels. These locations are categorised as a dwelling, school, shopping district, or government-affiliated locale.

Dwellings

The Burrow
The Weasleys' home, known as the Burrow, is located outside the village of Ottery St Catchpole which is situated alongside the River Otter in Devon, England, also near the home of the Lovegoods, the Diggorys and the Fawcetts. The Burrow was used as the Order of the Phoenix's headquarters, due to the compromised Fidelius Charm placed on 12 Grimmauld Place, in Harry Potter and the Deathly Hallows until it lost its given protection. The Weasley house has seven floors. It is also quite dilapidated, managing to remain standing only by magic. Despite the house's rundown appearance, Harry remarks on his first visit that it was the best house he had ever been in and it becomes his second favourite place in the world (after Hogwarts). The well-hidden orchard nearby doubles as a Quidditch pitch for the Weasley children.  A multitude of garden gnomes infests the garden of the Burrow.  There is also a small hangar located there that Arthur Weasley uses as a workshop to tinker with muggle items that he brings home (much to Mrs. Weasley's chagrin). In 1997, The Burrow became the headquarters of the Order of Phoenix after the death of the Hogwarts Headmaster, Albus Dumbledore.

In Harry Potter and the Chamber of Secrets, the Burrow was described as a pig-sty that had extra rooms added to it. When a new child was born, Molly and Arthur Weasley just added an extra room onto the house. Outside the front door were a jumble of Wellington boots and a rusty old cauldron.

Godric's Hollow

Godric's Hollow is a fictional village, where Lily and James Potter lived with their young son Harry, located in the West Country of England. It is noted for being home to a magical community like several other villages such as Ottery St Catchpole and Tinworth. The village was the home and final hiding place of James and Lily Potter before being murdered by Lord Voldemort. It was at this place that their baby son, Harry, was left with his lightning bolt-shaped scar.

Godric's Hollow was the home of long-dead Hogwarts founder Godric Gryffindor (after whom the village was named) and the home of James Potter's family. In Harry Potter and the Deathly Hallows, Harry returns to Godric's Hollow to visit his parents' graves, finding out that the church graveyard is the resting place for many wizard personalities, including a member of Hannah Abbott's family and, most famously, Ignotus Peverell and the Potters. Albus Dumbledore's mother Kendra moved her family to Godric's Hollow after her husband, Percival, was arrested for attacking three Muggle boys. Other notable residents of the village include Bowman Wright (inventor of the Golden Snitch) and Bathilda Bagshot, author of A History of Magic.

At the centre of the village square of Godric's Hollow, there is a war memorial that magically transforms into a monument to the Potter family – James, Lily, and Harry – when approached by witches and/or wizards unaccompanied by Muggles. Invisible to Muggles, the remains of Harry's old home (left just as it was after Voldemort attacked) are found at the end of the main street.

After Albus Dumbledore's arrest in Mould-on-the-Wold for cursing two muggles who had bullied his daughter Ariana, the Dumbledore family moved to Godric's Hollow. It was there that Bathilda Bagshot introduced Albus Dumbledore to her great-nephew Gellert Grindelwald.

Little Hangleton
Little Hangleton is a fictional Muggle village some 200 miles from Little Whinging notable as the place of origin of Voldemort's maternal and paternal ancestors, and as the place where he was restored to bodily form in Harry Potter and the Goblet of Fire. Although the village first appears in Goblet of Fire, the fourth volume in the series, it is not described until Harry Potter and the Half-Blood Prince, the sixth volume.

The village occupies the floor of a valley, bounded by steep hills, not far from the larger settlement of Great Hangleton. Above the village on one side of the valley are a church, a cemetery and the Riddle House, the former estate of the aristocratic Riddle family and at one time the finest house in the village. It first appears in the opening of Goblet of Fire as the location of Frank Bryce's murder; and at this point in the chronology of the Harry Potter series, it is decrepit and covered in vines. It is believed to be held by a "rich man" for tax purposes, although this is in reality to keep it from being sold or torn down.

During his time as a student, Tom Marvolo Riddle murdered his father and grandparents in the house.

On the opposite side of the valley, the only dwelling appears to have been the dilapidated cottage which was the home of the Pure-blooded, anti-social descendants of Salazar Slytherin, the Gaunt family. The Gaunt cottage is set in a copse alongside a winding road which climbed out of the valley. In Goblet of Fire, Voldemort and Harry fight in the graveyard of Little Hangleton.

Little Whinging

Little Whinging is a fictitious town in Surrey, England, located to the south of London. Alison Lurie noted in the New York Review of Books that Little Whinging's name is "a joke that American readers may not get: we [Americans] would call the place Little Whining".

Number 4, Privet Drive, Little Whinging, is the Dursleys' home, in which Harry lives with his aunt Petunia, uncle Vernon, and cousin Dudley. He has lived there since the age of fifteen months, having previously lived with his parents in Godric's Hollow; however, since he began attending Hogwarts, he spends little time there, though he reluctantly returns during the summer holidays. Number 4 is known to have four bedrooms upstairs, at least one bathroom, a kitchen, a sitting room and a conservatory downstairs (apart from the cupboard under the stairs).

The name of the street refers to the privet hedges that enclose many suburban gardens, as Rowling liked the idea of enclosure. In the novels and films, the Dursleys' home is in a respectable and boring neighbourhood where the neighbours ostracise Harry, who despises Little Whinging because of his memories of his cruel treatment there. Arabella Figg, who lives two streets away from 4 Privet Drive in the novels (but just across the road in the films) knows of Harry's magic, because she is a Squib member of the Order of the Phoenix, placed in Little Whinging by Dumbledore to keep an eye on Harry. In Harry Potter and the Order of the Phoenix, Dumbledore reveals that the reason Harry must return there at least once a year is because of the protection Harry's mother left upon him when she gave her life to save him. That act allowed an "ancient magic" to work, which meant Harry could never be harmed as long as he lived in the care of his mother's blood; in this case, his Aunt Petunia. This charm would not expire until Harry turned 17.

Other mentioned places in Little Whinging are Magnolia Crescent somewhat around the corner and a playground at a bit of a distance to Privet Drive which before Harry's fifth year has been partially demolished by Dudley and his gang.

Filming for Privet Drive in Harry Potter and the Philosopher’s Stone took place in a real urban area, 12 Picket Post Close, Bracknell in Berkshire, located 25 miles (40 km) west of London. For all the subsequent film's scenes set in Privet Drive, filming took place on a constructed set in Leavesden Film Studios (replicating 12 Picket Post Close), which proved to be cheaper than filming on location. This standing set, which remained in use throughout the decade-long filming history of the Harry Potter films, remains visible in Google Maps aerial views of the studio. It sits in a location with other Harry Potter sets and props.

Malfoy Manor
Malfoy Manor is the home of the aristocratic Malfoy family: Lucius, Narcissa, their son Draco Malfoy and later Bellatrix Lestrange (sister of Narcissa). It is mentioned in the fifth book that the manor is located somewhere in Wiltshire, England. The Malfoys were previously served by Dobby the house elf, before Lucius was tricked by Harry into freeing him.. It is considered to be one of the richest properties in the wizarding world.

In the Chamber of Secrets, Draco reveals that the manor has its own "chamber of secrets" under the drawing room, which was used to hide valuable dark artefacts when the Ministry raided the manor. Voldemort used Malfoy Manor as headquarters on at least one occasion in Deathly Hallows. The three Malfoys seemed quite displeased by this use of their manor as Voldemort himself noted; only Bellatrix appears to be pleased he is there. The Malfoys have become prisoners in their own home and are in very real fear for their lives. During the Deathly Hallows, several prisoners are being kept in the basement on Voldemort's orders, including Luna Lovegood, Dean Thomas, Griphook the Goblin, and Mr. Ollivander. When Snatchers capture Harry, Ron, and Hermione, they are brought to Malfoy Manor. They escape with the other prisoners thanks to Dobby's help. The four residents of the manor are then placed under house arrest by Lord Voldemort, until they join with other Death Eaters in the Battle of Hogwarts.

Malfoy Manor was partly shot at Hardwick Hall, Derbyshire – a National Trust property.

Number 12, Grimmauld Place
Number 12, Grimmauld Place (a pun on "grim old place"), London is the address and name of reference to the home of the Black family, an ancient and pure-blooded line of wizards. It first appears in the fifth book. The structure of Number 12 Grimmauld Place is a Georgian terraced house.

Number 12 houses the Black family tree on a wall tapestry, and an enchanted portrait of Walburga Black, Sirius' mother. An ancient and deeply mad house-elf named Kreacher is loyal to the portrait of Mrs. Black. There are other portraits of members of the Black family, including Phineas Nigellus Black, one-time Head of the Black family and least-popular Headmaster of Hogwarts. The staircase is lined with the heads of beheaded former house-elves, which are mounted onto the walls.

Many security measures are in place at Grimmauld Place: there are anti-apparation charms, the place is Unplottable, the whole house is under a Fidelius charm and it is disguised from Muggles and other interlopers. In the seventh book, it is noted that the neighbours had long ago come to terms with the houses on their square running straight from 11 to 13. It is as secure as any magical dwelling can be and can accommodate a large number of people. For this reason, it was chosen as the headquarters of the reconstituted Order of the Phoenix when Sirius offered it to the Order. Only magical people can see it, and only if told the location by the Secret Keeper himself.  The house is even immune from the 'Taboo' imposed by the Ministry of Magic after the coup d'état.  This is known because Hermione Granger mentions Voldemort by name at least once whilst inside the house.

The house fell into disrepair during Sirius' twelve-year imprisonment in Azkaban. Following his escape, he returned to it in the fifth book to discover that it was now a gloomy and unpleasant ruin teeming with dust, decay, magical creatures, and various dangers. Harry, Ron, Hermione, and various members of the Order gradually restore it to a livable condition over the course of this book. In Half-Blood Prince, Harry learns that he has inherited the property under the terms of Sirius' will, although he donates it to the Order (wanting no connection to the place where Sirius felt trapped and useless before his death).

In Deathly Hallows, it becomes a sanctuary for Harry, Ron, and Hermione while hiding from Voldemort. As the three attempt to escape the Ministry of Magic by Disapparating, Corban Yaxley seizes hold of Hermione and is transported along with them to 12 Grimmauld Place. This action breaks the Fidelius Charm on the house, allowing Voldemort's forces to know its location and forcing Harry and his friends to abandon it.

The Claremont Square area of London was used for the exteriors of Number 12, Grimmauld Place.

Shell Cottage

Shell Cottage is the home of Bill Weasley and Fleur Delacour after they get married in Deathly Hallows. It is located overlooking a beach outside the village of Tinworth in Cornwall. The cottage served as a hiding place for Harry, Ron, Hermione, Luna, Dean Thomas, Mr. Ollivander and Griphook after they managed to escape from imprisonment in Malfoy Manor. Dobby the house-elf was buried in the garden after he died with a tombstone reading "Here lies Dobby, a free elf". During the war, Bill himself was the Secret-Keeper for Bill and Fleur.

The Shell Cottage scenes were filmed on Freshwater West beach in the Pembrokeshire Coast National Park, Wales.

Spinner's End
Spinner's End is a Muggle street, on which sits the house of Severus Snape. It is described as one of several streets of identical brick houses. The street is located near a dirty river, the bank of which is strewn with litter. A mill with a tall chimney is close by. From the description of its surroundings it is likely that this is the house Severus Snape grew up in, thus making the place the fictitious town of Cokeworth.

Snape's front door opens directly into a sitting room that has the feeling of a dark, padded cell, containing walls filled with books, threadbare furniture, and a dim, candle-filled lamp that hangs from the ceiling. A hidden door leads to a narrow staircase. Spinner's End first appears in Half-Blood Prince, when Snape is visited by Bellatrix Lestrange and Narcissa Malfoy. In Deathly Hallows, it is revealed that Snape lived at Spinner's End as a young child and that Lily Potter and Petunia Dursley lived in the same town.

Schools

Beauxbatons

The Beauxbatons Academy of Magic is a magic school first introduced in Goblet of Fire. Beauxbatons has a history that goes back at least 700 years, when it first began participating in the Triwizard Tournament. Beauxbâtons is described as a boarding school located in the Pyrenees mountains of southern France full of ice sculptures and forest nymphs. The phrase beaux bâtons is intended to translate as "beautiful wands" in French.

Beauxbatons has a preponderance of French students, though Spanish, Portuguese, Dutch, Luxembourgians and Belgians also attend in large numbers. The delegation is led by headmistress Madame Olympe Maxime, a half-giantess; despite her proportions, she is beautiful, graceful, and well-dressed. Also singled out is  Fleur Delacour, the Beauxbâtons champion in the Triwizard Tournament, a beautiful girl with silvery hair who is a quarter-veela.

Students of Beauxbâtons are described mainly as beautiful long-haired girls and attractive boys. They have good manners and in general are positive.  Students from Beauxbâtons arrive at Hogwarts to take part in the Triwizard Tournament. They arrive in a carriage, brought by winged Palomino horses.

They speak French and stereotypical, heavily accented English. Jean-François Ménard, the translator of Harry Potter into French, wrote Madame Maxime as arrogant with very correct, aristocratic speech, while Fleur's tone was more distrustful. Ménard made these choices because "you cannot write French with a French accent".

In the screen adaptation Harry Potter and the Goblet of Fire, Beauxbâtons students are all female, while in the books it is co-educational.

The contrast between Beauxbâtons and Hogwarts can be interpreted as an allusion to the competition between the reasonable and decent Great Britain and the licentious and decadent France.

Castelobruxo 
Castelobruxo is the South American school of magic, based in Brazil. The exact location of the school is unknown as of yet, but is said to appear to Muggles (non-magic folk) as nothing more than ruins. To magic folk, it resembles a golden temple.

The school is guarded by small mischievous magical creatures called Caipora. The school's specialties are Magizoology and Herbology. The student attire is green robes. Famous alumni of the school include Libatius Borage (author of multiple potions books) and João Coelho (captain of a professional Quidditch team.)

In Harry Potter and the Goblet of Fire, Ron mentions that his brother Bill had a penfriend at this school.

Durmstrang

The Durmstrang Institute for Magical Learning is a magic school that makes its first appearance in Goblet of Fire. The school has existed for at least 700 years, when they began participating in the Triwizard Tournament. Dumbledore welcomes Durmstrang's students as "our friends from the North", and J. K. Rowling is said to have located the school somewhere in Northern Scandinavia. Durmstrang students wear heavy furs with blood-red robes. The students of Durmstrang mentioned by name are Russians and Bulgarians. Durmstrang is portrayed as an all-boys school in the film, but according to the book, it is co-ed. Several female students are mentioned, though not by name.

Durmstrang is known for placing an emphasis on the study of the Dark Arts. While other schools of magic in the series limit the study to Defence Against the Dark Arts, Durmstrang students actually learn them. In Deathly Hallows, it is revealed that the Dark wizard Gellert Grindelwald attended Durmstrang. He also carved the symbol of the Deathly Hallows onto the school's stone walls. Although Durmstrang teaches the Dark Arts as part of its curriculum, apparently the experiments performed by Grindelwald were considered too extreme even by the school's standards as he was expelled because of them.

The name "Durmstrang" is likely to be an allusion to the German phrase Sturm und Drang meaning storm and stress.

The contrast between Durmstrang and Hogwarts can be interpreted as an allusion to the war of the West with the bad from the East, as described in the gothic fiction of the fourteenth century.

Hogwarts

Hogwarts School of Witchcraft and Wizardry is a British school of magic for students aged eleven to seventeen, and is the primary setting for the first six books in J. K. Rowling's Harry Potter series.

Ilvermorny

Ilvermorny School of Witchcraft and Wizardry, shortened Ilvermorny, is an American school of magic, which serves as the school for the North American continent. It first appeared in a short story by J. K. Rowling on Pottermore on June 28, 2016, and its first onscreen mention was in Fantastic Beasts and Where to Find Them. The school was founded in the seventeenth century in Adams, Massachusetts, on Mount Greylock, the highest natural point in the state. It is concealed from the non-magic world by enchantments which may sometimes appear as a cloud surrounding the peak. Modeled after Hogwarts, the school has four Houses into which the students are sorted upon arrival.

Ilvermorny was founded by Isolt Sayre after she travelled from Ireland via England to North America on the Mayflower in 1620 and named after the cottage in which she had been born. She had not had the opportunity to attend Hogwarts during her childhood, and partially modelled Ilvermorny after what she had heard of Hogwarts, as well as her own imagination. Her first students were her own adopted children, Chadwick and Webster Boot.

Ilvermorny is divided into four houses: Thunderbird, Horned Serpent, Pukwudgie, and Wampus, each said to represent a different part of the ideal wizard. The names were chosen by Isolt Sayre and her family after their favourite magical creatures. Chadwick being "intelligent but also temperamental" chose the Thunderbird, his brother Webster "argumentative and fiercely loyal" chose the Wampus. Isolt herself was a Parselmouth and chose the Horned Serpent, and her No-Maj (Muggle or non-magical) husband James Steward picked the Pukwudgie, since Isolt's stories about one made him laugh. Ilvermorny has no house colours, but every student wears blue and cranberry robes, fastened by a gold Gordian Knot.

The Sorting process is also different to that of Hogwarts. Unlike Hogwarts, more than one Ilvermorny house can claim a student; when two or more carvings react, the student is entitled to choose their house.

Uagadou
Uagadou is the oldest of several African wizarding schools, and the largest in the entire world. Its address is 'Mountains of the Moon'. Students are informed of their acceptance to the school by Dream Messengers.

Mahoutokoro
Mahoutokoro is the smallest wizarding school, and is situated in Japan. Students wear enchanted robes, which grow in size with the wearer, and change colour in response to the wearer's increased magic knowledge, from faint pink to gold.

Diagon Alley

Diagon Alley is a high street located in London. It is accessible to the wizarding world, to which it is something of an economic hub, but hidden from Muggles (non-magical people). However, Muggles are allowed access to it if they need to accompany their Muggle-born magical children. If a wizard or witch needs something, chances are that it can be found in Diagon Alley.

One entrance to Diagon Alley can be reached on foot by passing through the Leaky Cauldron (a wizarding pub/inn). The inn, which is invisible to Muggles, lies in between a bookshop and a music shop. To enter Diagon Alley, one must go through the Leaky Cauldron to a rear courtyard and tap a brick in the wall, found by counting three up and two across, three times. In the film, the tapping of five bricks around a hole in the wall opens the doorway to Diagon Alley. Given the busy nature of the area, travelling to and from Diagon Alley is typically done by more magical means such as Apparition or by using the Floo Network,  both of which are means of wizarding transportation It contains shops that offer a wide range of magical supplies, as well as the goblin-run Gringotts Bank.

The DVD of Harry Potter and the Chamber of Secrets includes a video "guided tour" of Diagon Alley, apparently shot on the original film sets. In the first film, the Leaky Cauldron's entrance was filmed in Bull's Head Passage, near Leadenhall Market. In the sixth film, it was inserted into the actual Charing Cross Road, between a book store and a surveyors' storefront.

The name Diagon Alley is a near homophone of the word "diagonally", which is used as a plot device when Harry mispronounces the phrase near the beginning of the second book.

Eeylops Owl Emporium

Eeylops Owl Emporium sells owls and supplies such as owl treats and cages. Inside, it is dark and full of soft hooting, rustling, and the flickering of "jewel-bright eyes". It is here that Rubeus Hagrid purchased Harry's snowy owl, Hedwig, as a birthday gift in The Philosopher's Stone.

Florean Fortescue's Ice Cream Parlour
Florean Fortescue's Ice Cream Parlour, under the management of the owner Florean Fortescue (founder and shopkeeper), sold ice cream and other treats, which could be enjoyed at outdoor tables. Harry spent pleasant hours there working on homework assignments before his third year at Hogwarts in Prisoner of Azkaban. Mr Fortescue himself helped him with his school essays and supplied him with free sundaes every half-hour. Nearing the end of the summer holidays, Harry meets Ron and Hermione there. In the Half-Blood Prince the parlour is boarded up and Fortescue has gone missing. Rowling confirmed that Florean was murdered.

Flourish & Blotts

Flourish & Blotts sells a great variety of magic books, including textbooks for Hogwarts courses and other books of general magical interest. In the back there is a corner devoted solely to divination, which includes a small table stacked with titles like Predicting the Unpredictable: Insulate Yourself against Shocks and Broken Balls: When Fortunes Turn Foul. Another small display contains the book Death Omens: What to Do When You Know the Worst is Coming.

Usually, there is a display of gold-embossed spell books the size of paving slabs in the window, but in Prisoner of Azkaban, the front window holds an iron cage filled with hundreds of copies of The Monster Book of Monsters. To deal with the vicious books, set for the third year Care of Magical Creatures class by Hagrid, the harassed manager had to gear up with thick gloves and jab at them with a knobbly walking stick, as the books tended to rip each other apart. The manager says that he had thought he had seen the worst when they bought 200 copies of The Invisible Book of Invisibility, which were promptly misplaced.

In Chamber of Secrets, celebrity author Gilderoy Lockhart signs copies of his autobiography, Magical Me, at the shop the day Harry buys his second year school books. The signing drew a huge crowd of fans (mostly middle-aged women). This is also where Lucius Malfoy slips Tom Riddle's diary into Ginny's battered old Transfiguration book, thus causing the start of the events in Chamber of Secrets.

Gambol and Japes
Gambol and Japes is a wizarding joke shop. It is briefly mentioned in Chamber of Secrets, where Fred, George and Lee Jordan stock up on "Dr Filibuster's Fabulous Wet-Start, No-Heat Fireworks".

Gringotts Wizarding Bank

Gringotts Wizarding Bank is the only known bank of the wizarding world and it is operated primarily by goblins. A snowy white building, near the intersection of Knockturn Alley and Diagon Alley, Gringotts towers over all neighbouring shops. Customers pass through a set of bronze doors and then silver ones before entering the lobby. The main floor is paved with marble and has a long counter stretching along its length, behind which goblin clerks work at tasks such as counting coins and updating account ledgers. Within, wizards and witches keep their money and other valuables in vaults that are protected by very complex and very strong security measures. The vaults extend for miles under London and are accessible through rough stone passageways navigated by magic carts that travel speedily along their tracks. Gringotts also offers Muggle-Wizarding currency exchange.

When Harry first visits Gringotts, he is told by Hagrid that one would have to be mad to try to rob Gringotts. Goblins are extremely possessive and will protect their money and valuables at any cost, making them ideal guardians for the valuables of the wizarding world. In addition, according to Hagrid, apart from Hogwarts, Gringotts is considered "the safest place in the world for anything you want to keep safe".

There are a number of methods of opening the vaults. Most vaults, such as Harry's, use small golden keys. Higher-security vaults may have various enchantments or other measures upon the doors. For example, the door to Vault 713, which briefly contained the Philosopher's Stone, must be stroked by a certified Gringotts goblin, whereupon it melts away to allow access to the contents. If anyone other than a certified Gringotts goblin touches the door, that person will be sucked into the vault, which is only checked for trapped thieves about once every 10 years. Dragons guard the maximum-security vaults found in the lowest reaches of the bank, and a subterranean waterfall called the "Thief's Downfall" acts to overturn carts that pass through it and negate spells used by would-be robbers.

In the Philosopher's Stone Gringotts Vault 713 held a small parcel wrapped in paper, inside of which was the Philosopher's Stone. Dumbledore sent Hagrid to retrieve it while he escorted Harry. Later that same day, Professor Quirrell broke into the vault under orders from Voldemort. Although he was unsuccessful in obtaining the Philosopher's Stone, the break-in shocked the wizarding world because it was unheard of for Gringotts to be robbed. Griphook claims that the protection had been lessened due to the Vault being emptied. In Deathly Hallows, Harry, Ron, and Hermione, aided by a reluctant Griphook, break into the vault of Bellatrix Lestrange where a Horcrux of Voldemort (Hufflepuff's Cup) is hidden. However, when they enter Bellatrix's vault, which is stocked with all manner of treasures, they discover that the treasure has had Gemino and Flagrante curses placed on it, which, respectively, cause any item to multiply rapidly and go red-hot whenever it is touched. The trio escape with the Horcrux by freeing a half-blind dragon that was part of the security for the vault, and clambering onto its back.

While Gringotts is largely staffed by goblins, including Griphook and Ragnok, it is known that the bank has human employees, though not apparently for banking and accounting services. Bill worked as a curse-breaker for Gringotts in Egypt, retrieving artefacts from ancient Egyptian tombs and pyramids. Fleur took a part-time job with Gringotts after participating in the Triwizard Tournament, apparently to improve her English skills, and Wizard guards are mentioned in Deathly Hallows during the break in.

Knockturn Alley
Knockturn Alley (a play on the word "nocturnally") is a dark and seedy alleyway diagonal to Diagon Alley. It is frequently populated by Dark Wizards. Many of the shops in Knockturn Alley are devoted to the Dark Arts; the best known of which is Borgin & Burkes, which sells sinister and dangerous objects. Harry lands in Knockturn Alley in Chamber of Secrets, when accidentally saying (in the film version) "Diagonally" instead of Diagon Alley while using Floo Powder to get to Diagon Alley. Here Hagrid finds him (and narrowly rescues him from a witch with mossy teeth who is holding a tray with fingernails in it), while looking for Flesh-eating Slug repellent, for the school's cabbage patch. From there he takes him back to Diagon Alley, where they find Hermione Granger who takes them to the Weasleys.

Borgin & Burkes
Borgin and Burkes is an antique shop, which specializes in the Dark Arts, located in Knockturn Alley. The shop sells many dangerous and Dark artifacts such as a cursed opal necklace, a Hand of Glory, and half of a vanishing cabinet set which is used by Draco Malfoy to infiltrate Hogwarts in the Half-Blood Prince. Lord Voldemort worked at Borgin and Burkes briefly after he left Hogwarts during the mid-1940s. It is owned by Caractacus Burke and Mr. Borgin, though Mr. Borgin is the only owner to appear in the series.

The Leaky Cauldron

The Leaky Cauldron is a dark, shabby pub and inn for wizards, located on the Muggle street of Charing Cross Road in London, offering food, drinks and rooms to rent. It was founded by Daisy Dodderidge (1467–1555) in 1500 "to serve as a gateway between the non-wizarding world and Diagon Alley". The current barman and innkeeper is a wizard named Tom.

On the main floor, the inn has a bar, several private parlour rooms, and a large dining room. On the upper floors, there are a number of rooms available for rent; Harry has stayed in Room 11, which has a talking mirror and windows that allow him to look out onto Charing Cross Road. People often stay at The Leaky Cauldron when they come to London on shopping trips.

The pub serves as a way of entering into Diagon Alley from the Muggle world for Muggle-borns and their parents (both of whom, until the first letter from Hogwarts, have no magical knowledge or means of entering). The rear of The Leaky Cauldron opens onto a little courtyard, in which a particular brick must be tapped three times to open a path to Diagon Alley.

Madam Malkin's Robes for All Occasions
Madam Malkin's is a clothing shop next to Flourish & Blotts. It sells robes and other clothing, including the standard Hogwarts-required plain black work robes, and dress robes. Inside the shop, Madam Malkin and her assistants will tailor the robes to fit. Malkin is an archaic term for a crotchety old woman.

Harry has two meetings with Draco Malfoy in Madam Malkin's shop. This is where Harry meets the first wizard of his own age, Malfoy, for the first time, in Philosopher's Stone. Harry is rather bewildered by the questions Malfoy asks, because Harry is still unfamiliar with many aspects of the wizarding world. A second meeting occurs just before the beginning of Harry's sixth year, in Half-Blood Prince. This meeting is far more unpleasant, and escalates quickly into a near-duel before Malfoy and his mother leave in disgust.

Magical Menagerie
The Magical Menagerie is a magical creature shop that in addition to selling magical creatures offers advice on animal care and health. The shop is very cramped, noisy and smelly, due to every inch being covered with cages. Among the creatures in the Magical Menagerie are enormous purple toads, a firecrab, poisonous orange snails, a fat white rabbit that can turn into a silk top hat, cats of every colour, ravens, puffskeins, and a cage of sleek black rats that play skipping games with their tails.

When Harry, Ron, and Hermione visit the shop in Prisoner of Azkaban, a witch wearing heavy black spectacles helps them. Ron buys Rat Tonic for his pet rat, Scabbers, while Hermione buys a cat, Crookshanks.

Ollivanders

Ollivanders is a wand shop described as "narrow and shabby, with a sign that reads Ollivanders: Makers of Fine Wands since 382 BC in peeling gold letters over the door. The only display in the window overlooking Diagon Alley is a single wand lying on a faded purple cushion in the dusty window. Within, there are countless narrow boxes piled neatly right up to the ceiling and a spindly-legged chair" (which Hagrid breaks when he sits upon it).

Ollivander, the pale-eyed, white-haired shopkeeper (played in the films by John Hurt), makes and sells magic wands to witches and wizards as they enter school or break their old wands. He remembers every wand he has ever sold. To determine the best wand for a witch or wizard, Ollivander measures various body parts (including, in Harry's case, between his nostrils) and then checks the reactions of various wands to the buyer, a process to which he refers as "the wand choosing the wizard".

The shop closes when Ollivander goes missing in Half-Blood Prince, Voldemort having ordered his Death Eaters to kidnap him to attempt to discover more about the link between his own and Harry's wand. Harry rescues Ollivander in Deathly Hallows.

Potage's Cauldron Shop
Potage's Cauldron Shop sells different varieties and sizes of cauldrons, including copper, brass, pewter, silver, self-stirring, collapsible, and solid gold, according to a sign outside the shop. Hogwarts requires its students to have a size 2 pewter cauldron (as listed in the Philosopher's Stone book list). The Cauldron Shop is very near to the entrance from The Leaky Cauldron.

Quality Quidditch Supplies
Quality Quidditch Supplies sells broomsticks and Quidditch-related items. The store windows often draw young customers to gaze longingly at the merchandise. Its most famous items on display are the Nimbus 2000 and the Firebolt broomsticks, both of which Harry eventually owns. The Firebolt is a national racing broom that professional leagues use. Harry spends the summer before his third year gazing at the Firebolt in the display window, the price of which is only available upon request, and which Sirius Black purchases for Harry as an anonymous Christmas gift. Ron at one point longs for a full set of Chudley Cannons robes offered at the shop.

Slug and Jiggers Apothecary

The Apothecary sells scales, potions and potion ingredients. The shop is quite fascinating despite its very bad smell (a mixture of bad eggs and rotten cabbage). The inside includes barrels of slimy stuff on the floor, jars of herbs, dried roots and bright powders on the shelves, and bundles of feathers, strings of fangs and snarled claws hanging from the ceiling. Harry regularly buys ingredients, as well as his scales, from the Apothecary.

Some of the ingredients available are silver unicorn horns (for twenty-one Galleons each), glittery-black beetle eyes (five Knuts a scoop), and Dragon liver (seventeen Sickles an ounce).

Stalls
As well as many shops, Diagon Alley also contains small stalls, which sell a wide variety of magical objects, sweets, and trinkets. In Half-Blood Prince, many witches and wizards try to take advantage of the fear created by Voldemort's return. They set up stalls selling amulets and other objects, which supposedly protect you against werewolves, Dementors and Inferi. These "dark magic protection" stalls, however, are illegal, and likely scams. Arthur Weasley is the one in charge of arresting their owners.

Twilfitt and Tatting's
Twilfitt and Tatting's is a wizarding clothing shop located in Diagon Alley, mentioned in Half-Blood Prince by Narcissa Malfoy, who claims she would shop there rather than shopping in Madam Malkin's due to the presence of Harry, Ron, and Hermione (mostly Hermione, whom the Malfoys look down upon due to her blood status). By the tone in Narcissa's voice, it is implied to be slightly more upscale than Malkin's.

Wiseacre's Wizarding Equipment

Sells all sorts of equipment used in the wizard world and is where Harry buys his first telescope.

Weasleys' Wizard Wheezes
Weasleys' Wizard Wheezes is a popular joke shop that started as a small school business created by Fred and George Weasley in the fourth book. It opened its doors at Number 93 Diagon Alley in the summer of the sixth book, using Harry Potter's Triwizard Tournament Winnings as starting capital. Weasleys' Wizard Wheezes sells joke and trick items, useful novelties, sweets, and Defence Against the Dark Arts items. The front of the shop is described as a fireworks display against the muffled backdrop of dull shops. Some of their products are U-No-Poo, Skiving Snackboxes, trick wands, spell-checking and Smart Answer Quills, reusable Hangmans, Daydream Charms, muggle magic tricks, Edible Dark Marks, Shield Products, Peruvian Instant Darkness Powder, Decoy Detonators, joke cauldrons, Wonderwitch beauty products and 10-second pimple vanishers, Pygmy Puffs, love potions, and more.

Fred and George started using the name "Weasleys' Wizard Wheezes" in Goblet of Fire for a mail order business selling merchandise, including sweets to help students fake illness in order to skip classes. After an early departure from Hogwarts in Order of the Phoenix, the two Weasleys set up their shop in Diagon Alley, which quickly became a huge success.

Weasleys' Wizard Wheezes had to be temporarily shut down in Deathly Hallows, because the Death Eaters were keeping an eye on all the Weasleys, but Fred and George continued to run an Owl-Order service. In interviews post-publication of Deathly Hallows, Rowling has said that George (after Fred died) reopened the Diagon Alley store, that "it became a tremendous money-spinner", and that Ron worked for him there after taking Auror training and going to work for the Ministry of Magic. In the play Harry Potter and the Cursed Child, Ron runs the store nineteen years after the events of the Deathly Hallows.

Hogsmeade

Hogsmeade Village, or simply Hogsmeade, is the only settlement in Britain inhabited solely by wizards, witches, and other magical beings, and is located to the northwest of Hogwarts School of Witchcraft and Wizardry. It was founded by medieval wizard Hengist of Woodcroft who fled to Scotland to escape Muggle persecution of wizards in Northumberland. Much of Hogsmeade's architecture reflects its medieval origin; the village is known for its leaning medieval houses the most famous of which being the Three Broomsticks, an ancient inn built on the site of Woodcroft's home, and the backdrop for such dramatic wizarding events as the 1612 rebellion of Britain's goblins (the upper rooms of the inn served as the headquarters for the Ministry of Magic in its attempts to put down the insurrection in the Highlands). Hogsmeade primarily consists of a single thoroughfare, called High Street, on which most shops and other magical venues reside; however, unnamed alleyways branching off from the main road are also home to such historic places as the Hog's Head Inn and Madame Puddifoot's Teashop. Students of Hogwarts who are in their third year and above are permitted to visit Hogsmeade during scheduled visits, to shop and mingle with friends un-chaperoned, as long as they have a signed permission slip from a parent or guardian. Mainly, students frequent a high street in the village which contains the named speciality shops and pubs in the series. Otherwise, they wander on to observe the infamous Shrieking Shack. Hogsmeade gives its name to the train station which serves as one end of the route traveled by the Hogwarts Express to transport students to and from London. Students must walk or take a carriage to travel between Hogsmeade and Hogwarts.

Hogsmeade remained unseen in the Harry Potter film series until 2004's Prisoner of Azkaban. The village has since appeared again in Order of the Phoenix, Half-Blood Prince and Deathly Hallows – Part 2. In all of these, the village is seen under heavy caps of snow.

Dervish & Banges
A shop that sells and repairs magical equipment, Dervish & Banges is located near the end of the High Street.

Gladrags Wizardwear
Gladrags Wizardwear sells clothing. There are other branches in London and Paris. It is full of quirky merchandise, and appears to specialise in strange and unusual socks, where Harry buys Dobby a selection of wacky socks, in thanks for helping him in the second task of the Triwizard Tournament.

Honeydukes
Honeydukes is a popular sweets shop located in Hogsmeade that is usually crowded with Hogwarts students and occasionally even the professors of Hogwarts. The shop is filled with many different kinds of wonderful and wild sweets, such as Bertie Botts Every Flavoured Beans, Cauldron Cakes, Blood-Flavoured Lollipops, Acid Pops, Droobles Best Blowing Gum, Chocolate Wands, Exploding Bonbons, Skeletal Sweets, and so much more. There is also a secret passageway in the cellar of Honeydukes that leads to the third floor corridor of Hogwarts, behind the large stone statue of Gunhilda of Gorsemoor. Harry used this entrance to sneak into Hogsmeade in Harry Potter and the Prisoner of Azkaban.

Hogsmeade Station
Hogsmeade Station is the closest train stop to Hogwarts; the Hogwarts Express stops here after travelling from King's Cross. Scenes involving Hogsmeade Station in the Harry Potter films were shot at Goathland railway station on the North Yorkshire Moors Railway, built in 1865 and virtually unchanged, that serves the village of Goathland in the North York Moors.
According to Rowling's illustrations, Hogsmeade station is not in Hogsmeade, but on the opposite side of the lake.

The Hog's Head
The Hog's Head is another pub, which often attracts a more disreputable clientele than the Three Broomsticks, and many of the customers hide their faces out of a desire not to be recognised. The hanging sign in front of the pub has a severed boar's head, leaking blood onto the white cloth around it. The pub itself is filthy, with the floor covered with layers of dirt and the windows smeared with so much grime that little light gets through. The main floor is a single room, but there are additional rooms on the upper floors. Harry notes that the pub smells strongly of goats. The barman and owner is Aberforth Dumbledore, the brother of Hogwarts Headmaster, Albus Dumbledore, although this is not revealed until the final book.

Despite its seedy reputation, the Hog's Head has been host to several important events in the world of Harry Potter. The inn was the headquarters of the 1612 Goblin Rebellion. A few months before Harry was born, it was here that the Seer Sybill Trelawney revealed the prophecy connecting Voldemort and Harry during an interview with Dumbledore for the position of Divination teacher at Hogwarts, while Professor Severus Snape listens to the first part of the prophecy. It is also where Hagrid wins an illegal dragon egg (Norbert) while gambling with a disguised servant of Voldemort. In Order of the Phoenix, the first meeting of Dumbledore's Army is secretly held at the Hog's Head.

During Deathly Hallows, Aberforth reveals a secret passage that leads into Hogwarts' Room of Requirement, where Dumbledore's Army has set up headquarters. The Hog's Head entrance is hidden behind a portrait of Ariana Dumbledore, the younger sister of Albus and Aberforth. Before the Battle of Hogwarts begins, the passage is used to evacuate underage students from the school. The remaining members of Dumbledore's Army and the Order of the Phoenix gather at the Hog's Head before entering the castle through this passage to fight Voldemort and his Death Eaters.

The name of the tavern refers to an archaic unit of liquid measurement, the hogshead. It may also be an allusion to the "Boar's Head Tavern" from the play Henry IV, Part 1 by William Shakespeare. Much like The Hog's Head, Shakespeare's tavern is the haunt of some less-than-reputable characters. It should also be noted that there is a second hand music shop by the name of "The Hog's Head" less than a mile from JK Rowling's residence in Edinburgh, Scotland. The shop was established four years before Harry Potter and the Philosopher's Stone was released.

Madam Puddifoot's

Located on a little side street off the main High Street, Madam Puddifoot's is a small teashop favourite among Hogwarts couples out on dates. It's described as a cramped, steamy place where everything is adorned with bows or frills.  The small, circular tables are set for two. On Valentine's Day Madam Puddifoot hires floating golden cherubs to throw pink confetti on visiting couples. It was at Madam Puddifoot's that Harry celebrated his Valentine's Day with Cho Chang, in the fifth book, Order of the Phoenix.

Post Office
The Post Office is filled with at least two to three hundred owls, ranging from great grey owls to tiny scops (the latter for "local deliveries only"), hooting down from colour-coded shelves. These owls deliver mail to people in the wizarding world. The shelves are colour-coded based on how quickly they will arrive at their destination.

Scrivenshaft's Quill Shop
Scrivenshaft's Quill Shop sells a range of wizarding stationery like quills, ink, parchment, envelopes, seals, etc. 
Hermione buys a new quill here in Harry Potter and the Order of the Phoenix.

Shrieking Shack
The Shrieking Shack stands on the outskirts of Hogsmeade, just a little way above the rest of the village, with boarded-up windows and an overgrown garden. It's described to be slightly creepy even in daylight. Connected to Hogwarts by a secret tunnel underneath the Whomping Willow, which was planted specifically to conceal the tunnel, the Shrieking Shack was built so Remus Lupin could hide in it during his monthly transformations into a werewolf, to avoid harming fellow students or other innocents. The villagers heard Lupin's howls while he resided there, and mistook it for violent spirits. This rumour, further encouraged by Dumbledore to discourage anyone from investigating, led to the Shrieking Shack being officially regarded as the most haunted building in Britain. Apparently, the tunnel through the Whomping Willow is the only way to get in to the Shrieking Shack.

In Prisoner of Azkaban, the Shrieking Shack becomes part of the dramatic conclusion of the book when Sirius returns to the school. He drags Ron and his pet rat, Scabbers, there intending to kill Scabbers. Scabbers is revealed to be the Animagus Peter Pettigrew, Black's former friend who had betrayed the Potters to Voldemort, a crime for which Black had been blamed and sentenced to lifetime imprisonment in Azkaban. In the book Deathly Hallows, Snape is killed in the Shrieking Shack by Voldemort's snake, Nagini.

The Three Broomsticks
The Three Broomsticks is a well known inn and pub located on High Street in the village of Hogsmeade. It is known for its delicious butterbeer and its beautiful owner Madam Rosmerta, who lives above the pub. The Three Broomsticks is a favoured destination among Hogwarts students and staff, although in Harry Potter and the Philosopher's Stone, Hagrid mentions visiting the Hog's Head. It is the site of important events in the series, including Harry's interview with Rita Skeeter in his fifth year.
It is described as being warm, smoky, crowded, and noisy. As well as butterbeer, it serves firewhisky (although seemingly not to students, as mentioned by Ron in the Hog's Head in the fifth year), gillywater, Rosmerta's oak-matured mead, and many muggle drinks. Madam Rosmerta usually works at the bar, in the front or the side of the room. There is a fireplace in the back of the pub and an inn above.

Zonko's Joke Shop
Zonko's Joke Shop has jokes and tricks that can "fulfil even Fred and George's wildest dreams". Some of these include Dungbombs, Hiccup Sweets, Frog Spawn Soap, and Nose-Biting Teacups. It closes down in Half-Blood Prince. Fred and George later buy the shop.

Government-affiliated locales

Azkaban

Azkaban is a prison where wizards who violate the laws of the British wizarding world are sent. Only one other such prison, Nurmengard, is mentioned in the books. According to Half-Blood Prince, Azkaban is "in the middle of the North Sea". Sirius Black says that when he escaped from Azkaban while in his animagus form as a dog, he swam to Britain and then travelled northwards to get to Hogwarts. This implies that Azkaban is at a lower latitude than Hogwarts, which is in Scotland. Although Azkaban's appearance is not described in detail in the books, it is mentioned to have grounds outside the prison where prisoners who have died are buried. In the film adaptations it appears to be a tall triangular building, somewhat hollow in the middle.

Many of the prisoners were supporters of Voldemort (known as Death Eaters), though some misunderstandings have resulted in others' imprisonment. For instance, Sirius Black was imprisoned without trial after Peter Pettigrew killed a dozen Muggles, faked his own death, and framed Sirius for these crimes; Sirius escapes after serving 12 years. Two years later, Harry is threatened with a term in Azkaban after he performs a Patronus Charm that saves both him and his cousin Dudley from a Dementor attack. Performing any of the Unforgivable Curses on a human is punishable by a mandatory whole life sentence in Azkaban, but that ban has been lifted for Aurors during wartime. Several characters throughout the series have performed the curses and not been punished accordingly. Other crimes which merit imprisonment here include assaulting the Ministry (for example, the Death Eaters detained in Order of the Phoenix), trespassing in the Ministry (Sturgis Podmore in Order of the Phoenix), being an unregistered Animagus, and impersonating an Inferius.

Azkaban has a reputation of evil and fear throughout the series. As mentioned at the start of the series, Azkaban is guarded by the Dementors, working under the Ministry of Magic. The large presence of Dementors renders the inmates incapable of happiness and forces them to relive their worst memories, as they become gradually helpless and often severely insane. According to Sirius, many inmates simply stop eating and eventually die of starvation. Sirius' reasoning for this is that "They simply lose their will to live". As Dementors are extremely difficult to injure – the only spell effective against them is the Patronus Charm – Azkaban was long considered impossible to escape from, until Sirius escaped (although Barty Crouch Jr had previously broken out with the help of his parents); however, Dumbledore claimed he could break out of Azkaban if he wished to do so.

In Order of the Phoenix, ten of Voldemort's most dangerous and loyal followers escaped, including Bellatrix Lestrange. Dumbledore was always vocal in declaring that it was a mistake to guard Voldemort's greatest supporters with Dementors, who have the most to gain if Voldemort returned to power. He is proven right, as the Dementors leave their posts at Azkaban and join ranks with Voldemort. The prison is still in use, but greatly weakened by the revolt of its most effective wardens. Azkaban also had various wizard guards, who kept the Dementors mostly in check and managed the rare prison visits. By the start of Deathly Hallows, there had been another mass break-out of Death Eaters from Azkaban. Upon Voldemort's takeover of the Ministry, many political prisoners are sent to Azkaban by Ministry traitor Dolores Umbridge, including Xenophilius Lovegood and Muggle-borns persecuted under Voldemort's implementation of anti-Muggle legislation. Such victims are released following Voldemort's downfall, and Umbridge is imprisoned there, along with whichever Death Eaters survived the Battle of Hogwarts.

Following Voldemort's ultimate demise, Kingsley Shacklebolt ends the use of Dementors at Azkaban, their presence having always been a mark of the underlying corruption of the Ministry.

Magical Congress of the United States of America
The Magical Congress of the United States of America (shortened MACUSA) is the magical body in charge of governing the wizarding population of the United States of America. It is led by the President of the Magical Congress of the United States of America. Unlike the No-Maj United States Congress, which is divided into a House of Representatives and a Senate, the MACUSA is unicameral. The MACUSA is located within the Woolworth Building in downtown New York City and spans hundreds of stories.

Newt Scamander visited the building in the film Fantastic Beasts and Where to Find Them, when he was brought in by Porpentina "Tina" Goldstein for threatening the Statute of Secrecy by using magic in front of Jacob Kowalski, a No-Maj.

Ministry of Magic

The Ministry of Magic is the government of the Magical community of Britain.
The "Ministry of Magic" was first mentioned in "The Philosopher's Stone".

St Mungo's Hospital for Magical Maladies and Injuries
St Mungo's Hospital for Magical Maladies and Injuries is a hospital within the Harry Potter universe. Medics at the hospital are not called doctors, but are known as Healers and wear lime-green robes. Founded by famous wizard Healer Mungo Bonham, St Mungo's is located in London. It was established to treat magical maladies, injuries or illnesses endemic to the Wizarding World. To enter the premises, one has to step through the window of what appears to be a derelict department store called Purge & Dowse Ltd. The exteriors of the hospital are red-bricked and dirty, which is the complete opposite of the interiors. Inside, everything is very neat and looks exactly as a hospital should. There are six floors. The emblem of St Mungo's is a magic wand crossed with a bone. This is the hospital where Arthur Weasley is sent after he was attacked by Voldemort's snake, Nagini, in the Ministry of Magic and Minerva McGonagall is hospitalised from severe stunning when Hagrid is forced out of Hogwarts. During one visit, Harry and company happen across Neville Longbottom, who has come with his grandmother Augusta Longbottom to visit his parents in the long-term care ward. They also find former professor Gilderoy Lockhart there, still suffering from the effects of a backfired Memory Charm.

Nurmengard
Nurmengard is the prison that Gellert Grindelwald built to keep his enemies and Muggles in. The entrance is marked with the symbol of the Deathly Hallows, along with the legend "For the greater good". After Dumbledore defeated Grindelwald, the prisoners were released and Grindelwald himself was imprisoned in the top-most cell. Nurmengard is depicted in the final book when Voldemort arrives at the prison looking for Grindelwald and information about the Elder Wand. After Grindelwald refuses to give him any information, Voldemort kills him in his own prison.

Platform Nine and Three-Quarters

The ride on the Hogwarts Express starts from King's Cross railway station platform , which is hidden from view, and reached by walking through the barrier between platforms 9 and 10.

Rowling discovered after the books were published that she had confused the layout of King's Cross with that of Euston station, and that platforms 9 and 10 at King's Cross were not the ones between which she had meant her magical platform to be placed. There is no platform between lines 9 and 10 at King's Cross. To solve this, the filmmakers re-numbered platforms 4 and 5 for the duration of filming. In reality, at both King's Cross and Euston, platforms 9 and 10 are separated by railway lines. The exterior shots in the film are of the St Pancras Renaissance London Hotel, which is part of St Pancras station, adjacent to King's Cross station. From the outside St Pancras is much more visually dramatic than King's Cross.

A plaque depicting the supposed location was placed on the wall in the building containing platforms 9 to 11, along with a luggage trolley 'stuck' halfway through the wall. During the station's extensive renovation works, it was moved temporarily to an exterior wall on the Euston Road, and then in 2012 to the new western departures concourse. A wrought iron 'Platform ' gate used as part of the film set is preserved at the National Railway Museum. Soon after Alan Rickman's death in 2016, Harry Potter fans created a memorial to the actor at platform .

A Harry Potter-themed store is also located in the station near the plaque.

Filming locations
The following are locations used by Warner Bros. to film the fictional locations in the Harry Potter film series.
Ashridge, Berkhamsted, Hertfordshire (Forbidden Forest and various woodland scenes in all films)
Burnham Beeches, Burnham, Buckinghamshire (woodland scenes in Harry Potter and the Deathly Hallows – Part 1)
Australia House, The Strand, London (Gringotts Bank)
Alnwick Castle, Northumberland (Hogwarts exterior)
Bodleian Library, Oxford (Hogwarts interiors)
Borough Market, London (Diagon Alley)
12 Picket Post Close, Winkfield Row, Bracknell, Berkshire (4 Privet Drive).
Christ Church, Oxford (Hogwarts interiors)
Claremont Square, near Amwell St., Islington, London Borough of Islington, London. (12 Grimmauld Place. Sirius Black family residence, and location of the Order of the Phoenix).
Divinity School, Oxford (Hogwarts hospital wing)
Durham Cathedral (Hogwarts interiors)
Glenfinnan Viaduct, Scotland (Viaduct used in the Hogwarts Express scenes)
Gloucester Cathedral (Hogwarts corridors)
Goathland railway station, Yorkshire (Hogsmeade Station)
Great Scotland Yard, (Harry and Mr Weasley enter a phone box in Harry Potter and the Order of the Phoenix enter into the Ministry of Magic)
Harrow School, (Professor Flitwick's classroom)
King's Cross Station, London (King's Cross interior)
Lacock Abbey, Wiltshire (Hogwarts interiors)
Leadenhall Market, London (Diagon Alley & Leaky Cauldron)
London Zoo (Reptile House)
Malham Cove, North Yorkshire (Camping location, atop limestone pavement)
Queensway Tunnel (Merseyside),   (Chase sequence in Harry Potter and the Deathly Hallows – Part 1)
Millennium Bridge, London (Death Eater attack at start of Half-Blood Prince)
New College, Oxford (Hogwarts cloisters)
Freshwater West beach, Pembrokeshire, Wales (Shell Cottage)
Piccadilly Circus, exterior shots where we see Harry, Hermione and Ron rushing through London's West End
St Pancras railway station, London (King's Cross exterior).
St Paul's Cathedral, London (Spiral staircase in Hogwarts).
Saint Cyriac's, Church of England, Church Street, Lacock, Wiltshire, and village of Lacock. (Godric's Hollow Parish Church and Godric's Hollow).
Scottish Highlands, Scotland (Outdoor scenes in Prisoner of Azkaban and Half-Blood Prince)
Surbiton railway station, South London (Railway and cafe scene at the start of Half-Blood Prince)
Virginia Beach, Virginia (stock footage for extras Philosopher's Stone and Chamber of Secrets)
Virginia Water Lake, Surrey (Lakeside scenes in Prisoner of Azkaban, Goblet of Fire and Half-Blood Prince)
Westminster Hall (Hogwarts Great Hall ceiling)
 Cliffs of Moher (cave scene from Half-Blood Prince)

See also
 The Shambles

References

External links

 Gazetteer of the Wizarding World at Harry Potter Lexicon

Fictional elements introduced in 1997
 
Harry Potter
Harry Potter
Fictional populated places in Scotland
Fictional locations in Scotland
Harry Potter lists